Sahapur is a suburb of Old Malda in Malda district of West Bengal, India.

Geography

Location                             

Demographics
According to the 2011 Census of India, Sahapur had a total population of 9,906, of which 5,082 (51%) were males and 4,824 (49%) were females. Population in the age range 0-6 years was 1,112. The total number of literate persons in  Sahapur was 6,119 (69.58% of the population over 6 years).

Infrastructure
According to the District Census Handbook, Maldah, 2011, Sahapur covered an area of 1.8292 km2. The protected water-supply involved overhead tank, tube well/ bore well, hand pump. It had 871 domestic electric connections. Among the medical facilities it had 1 dispensary/ health centre, 4 maternity and child welfare centres, 10 medicine shops. Among the educational facilities, it had 5 primary schools, 2 middle schools. Among the social, cultural and recreational facilities it had 1 orphanage home, 1 public library, 1 reading room. It produced fish, beedi, coke.

References

Cities and towns in Malda district